Brasserie de Dudelange was a Luxembourgish brewery which was founded by Jean-Pierre Steyer in 1937 and brewed in the city of Dudelange. In 1964 it was taken over by Brasserie Funck-Bricher. Brewing in Dudelange as well as producing beer under the Brasserie de Dudelange brand name stopped.

References

Breweries in Luxembourg
Food and drink companies established in 1937
1937 establishments in Luxembourg